Erna Osland (born 24 February 1951) is a Norwegian teacher and author of children's literature. She made her literary debut in 1987 with the youth's book Natteramnen. She received the Norwegian Critics Prize for Best children's book in 1999 for Salamandarryttaren.

References

Norwegian children's writers
Norwegian Critics Prize for Literature winners
1951 births
Living people
Norwegian women children's writers